Julian Rieckmann (born 1 August 2000) is a German professional footballer who plays as a defender for  club 1. FC Magdeburg.

After playing youth football for SG Elbdeich and Werder Bremen, he made his senior debut for Werder Bremen II in 2018 and went on to make 52 appearances for Werder Bremen II across a three-year spell. He joined 3. Liga side 1. FC Magdeburg in summer 2021.

Club career

Early career
Born in Winsen, Rieckmann started his youth career at SG Elbdeich before joining Werder Bremen in 2013. He extended his contract with the club in March 2018, with the contract set to become professional upon his 18th birthday. He made his senior debut for Werder Bremen II on 28 July 2018 in a 0–0 draw with VfL Wolfsburg II. Over three seasons, Rieckmann made 52 appearances for Werder Bremen II and scored once.

1. FC Magdeburg
In June 2021, Rieckmann joined 3. Liga club 1. FC Magdeburg on a contract of undisclosed length.

International career
Rieckmann has represented Germany at under-16, under-17 and under-19 levels.

References

External links

2000 births
Living people
German footballers
People from Harburg (district)
Footballers from Lower Saxony
Association football defenders
SV Werder Bremen players
SV Werder Bremen II players
1. FC Magdeburg players
3. Liga players
Regionalliga players
Germany youth international footballers